The Men's short race at the 2001 IAAF World Cross Country Championships was held at the Hippodrome Wellington in Ostend (Oostende), Belgium, on March 24, 2001.  Reports of the event were given in The New York Times, in the Herald, and for the IAAF.

Complete results for individuals, for teams, medallists, and the results of British athletes who took part were published.

Race results

Men's short race (4.1 km)

Individual

Teams

Note: Athletes in parentheses did not score for the team result

Participation
An unofficial count yields the participation of 157 athletes from 47 countries in the Men's short race.

 (1)
 (4)
 (2)
 (4)
 (6)
 (5)
 (5)
 (4)
 (1)
 (2)
 (6)
 (4)
 (1)
 (5)
 (4)
 (2)
 (6)
 (3)
 (6)
 (1)
 (4)
 (2)
 (6)
 (5)
 (4)
 (1)
 (1)
 (1)
 (5)
 (1)
 (4)
 (2)
 (1)
 (1)
 (1)
 (6)
 (6)
 (5)
 (5)
 (1)
 (4)
 (1)
 (6)
 (6)
 (4)
 (1)
 (1)

See also
 2001 IAAF World Cross Country Championships – Senior men's race
 2001 IAAF World Cross Country Championships – Junior men's race
 2001 IAAF World Cross Country Championships – Senior women's race
 2001 IAAF World Cross Country Championships – Women's short race
 2001 IAAF World Cross Country Championships – Junior women's race

References

Men's short race at the IAAF World Cross Country Championships
IAAF